Dilate is the seventh studio album by American singer-songwriter Ani DiFranco, released in 1996. Dilate is her highest-selling and most critically acclaimed record, with US sales of over 480,000 units according to SoundScan. In 2011, Slant Magazine placed the album at No. 67 on its list of "The 100 Best Albums of 1990s".

Track listing

Personnel
Ani DiFranco – synthesizer, acoustic guitar, bass, guitar, bongos, electric guitar, steel guitar, Hammond organ, vocals, thumb piano
Michael Ramos – Hammond organ
Andy Stochansky – drums
David Travers-Smith – trumpet

Production
Ani DiFranco  – record producer, mixing, sampling, arranger, sequencing, artwork, design
Robin Aubé – engineer
Bob Doidge – engineer
Andrew Gilchrist – engineer
Mark Hallman – engineer
Marty Lester – engineer
Ed Stone – engineer
Chris Bellman – mastering
Adam Pause – artwork, design
Mark Van-S – photography

Charts

References

Ani DiFranco albums
1996 albums
Righteous Babe Records albums